The Watson Ranch Quartzite is a geologic formation in Utah. It preserves fossils dating back to the Ordovician period.

Background
The namesake of the quartzite is the homestead of Jack Watson, owner of the Watson Ranch. The ranch was in the Fossil Mountain and Ibex area.

Further reading

See also

 List of fossiliferous stratigraphic units in Utah
 Paleontology in Utah

References

Ordovician geology of Utah
Quartzite formations
Ordovician southern paleotropical deposits